Otagi Nenbutsu-ji is a Buddhist temple in the Arashiyama neighborhood of Kyoto, Japan.

Otagi Nenbutsu-ji was founded by Empress Shōtoku in the middle of the eighth century. Though was destroyed by the flooding of the Kamo River, it was rebuilt as an offshoot of Enryaku-ji, a nearby temple. In the 13th century, it was again destroyed during a civil war. The temple was moved to its current location in 1922, later suffering typhoon damage in 1950.

The gate of the temple contains two fierce-looking Nio statues.  Inside the temple are more than 1200 rakan, stone statues representing the disciples of Buddha.  These statues, in keeping with rakan traditions, are generally humorous.  The sculptures were donated in 1981 in honor of the refurbishment of the temple. Most were carved by amateurs, taught by sculptor Kocho Nishimura.

See also 
 For an explanation of terms concerning Japanese Buddhism, Japanese Buddhist art, and Japanese Buddhist temple architecture, see the Glossary of Japanese Buddhism.

External links

Official site (Japanese)

Buddhist temples in Kyoto
8th-century establishments in Japan
Important Cultural Properties of Japan
Tendai temples